Gabbay may refer to:

 Gabbai, a person who assists in running a synagogue
Awards
 Gabbay Award, Jacob and Louise Gabbay Foundation annual awards to recognize outstanding work in the biomedical sciences
people
 Avi Gabbay, an Israeli politician and the current leader of the Israeli Labor Party
 Dov Gabbay (born 1945), British mathematical logician and computer scientist
 Hamid Gabbay, Iranian-born American architect
 Yisroel Meir Gabbai, a Breslover Hasid who travels the world to locate, repair and maintain Jewish cemeteries and kevarim (gravesites) of Torah notables
Math 
 Gabbay's separation theorem, a term in mathematical logic and computer science, named after Dov Gabbay
Logic
  Gabbay-makinson conditions (Rational consequence relation), a term in Logic